Davtashen Bridge or Davitashen Bridge is a bridge for traffic linking across the Hrazdan River in Yerevan, Armenia. It connects the Vaghrshyan street of Arabkir district with the Sasna Tzrer street of Davtashen district within the capital city. The construction process was launched during the 1970s by the Soviet government but abandoned shortly after. Only in 2000, the construction of the bridge was completed. Height above the water level of the river Hrazdan -92m. The bridge was constructed by Kamurjshin company.

The bridge was designed by architect Rafael Israelyan.

References

Bridges in Yerevan
Bridges completed in 1996
Road bridges in Armenia